The Crawford River or Smoky River, a perennial river of the Glenelg Hopkins catchment, is located in the Western District of Victoria, Australia.

Course and features

See also

References

External links
 

Glenelg Hopkins catchment
Rivers of Barwon South West (region)
Western District (Victoria)